Hasson Arbubakrr (born December 9, 1960) is a former American football defensive end in the National Football League (NFL) and the Canadian Football League (CFL). He was drafted by the Tampa Bay Buccaneers in the ninth round of the 1983 NFL Draft. He used to be known as "Tic Tic Boom" while on the Minnesota Vikings.  He played a single season with the Minnesota Vikings and the Tampa Bay Buccaneers (1983–1984) before playing four years in the CFL with the Winnipeg Blue Bombers (1985–1987) and the Ottawa Rough Riders.

Raised in Newark, New Jersey, Arbubakrr played his first two years of prep football at Malcolm X Shabazz High School before transferring for his final two seasons and graduating from Weequahic High School in 1979. Arbubakrr played college football at Pasadena Community College and Texas Tech.

Arbubakrr is the father of Utah Jazz basketball player Hassan Whiteside.

References

1960 births
Living people
American football defensive ends
Canadian football defensive linemen
Malcolm X Shabazz High School alumni
Minnesota Vikings players
Ottawa Rough Riders players
Pasadena City Lancers football players
Players of American football from Newark, New Jersey
Players of Canadian football from Newark, New Jersey
Tampa Bay Buccaneers players
Texas Tech Red Raiders football players
Weequahic High School alumni
Winnipeg Blue Bombers players